Mull is an unincorporated community in White River Township, Randolph County, in the U.S. state of Indiana.

History
A post office was established at Mull in 1897, and remained in operation until it was discontinued in 1901.

Geography

References

Unincorporated communities in Randolph County, Indiana
Unincorporated communities in Indiana